Judith Barry (born 1954) is an American artist, writer, and educator best known for her installation and performance art and critical essays, but also known for her works in drawing and photography. She is a professor and the director of the MIT Program in Art, Culture and Technology at the Massachusetts Institute of Technology, Cambridge, MA. She has exhibited internationally and received a number of awards.

Biography 
Judith Barry was born in 1954 in Columbus, Ohio. She has attended the University of California at Berkeley and the San Francisco Art Institute. Barry received a Bachelor of Science in architecture from the University of Florida in 1978. She received a Master of Arts in Communication Arts, Computer Graphics from the New York Institute of Technology in 1986. She is represented by Rosamund Felsen Gallery in Los Angeles.

Teaching 
In 2002–2003 Barry was a visiting artist at the School of Architecture and Planning at Massachusetts Institute of Technology (MIT). From 2003 to 2005 she was a professor at the Merz Academy in Stuttgart, Germany. Since 2004, she has been a Professor in and Director of Lesley University's Art Institute of Boston and also teaches Sculpture at Cooper Union. Barry is a Director of the ACT program at MIT in Cambridge, Massachusetts.

Works 
In the 1980s and 1990s Barry focused on photographic and video works which examined gender, film theory, and perception. She was also concerned with architecture and media, including exhibition design. She has created small scale installations in which the viewer engages with the artwork in some way, such as Space Invaders (1980), Speedflesh (1999), and Study for Mirror and Garden (2008). She has also created complete exhibition spaces for shows such as the group exhibitions Damaged Goods (1986) and a/drift (1996), and for Judith Barry: Body without Limits (2008), a twelve-installation survey of her work.

Barry has an ongoing interest in the personal voice and its social and political functions, that has informed works such as First and Third and Cairo Stories. First and Third (1987) was created from interviews with immigrants in America, who discussed the promises and realities of their experiences of the “American dream.” Cairo Stories is a collection of video interviews of more than 200 Cairene women during the US invasion of Iraq in 2003 and the beginning of the Egyptian Revolution of 2011. Each story chronicles personal experiences of the women. Each person interviewed has a different social and economic class in Egypt, to remind the viewer that history, representation, and translation are issues that effect many cultures.

Barry has exhibited internationally including at Lumiar Cité (2020), Berardo Collection Museum (2010), Domus Artium DA2 in Salamanca, Spain (2008), Cairo Biennale (2001), the Venice Biennale of Art/Architecture (2000), the São Paulo Art Biennial (1994), Nagoya Biennial (1993), Carnegie International (1992), and the Whitney Biennial (1987), among others. Her critical essays and fiction include the essay collection Public Fantasy (1991).

Awards 
 1978 – LINE (book award)
 1986 – New York Foundation for the Arts, emerging forms fellowship
 1986 – New York State Council on the Arts, video Art Matters (project grant)
 1989 – Art Matters (project grant), National Endowment for the Arts (NEA), artists fellowship
 1990 – New York Foundation for the arts, emerging forms fellowship
 1996 – Wexner Center for the Arts Residency in Video
 1997 – New York Foundation for the Arts, emerging forms fellowship
 2000 – Frederick John Kiesler Prize for Architecture and the Arts
 2001 – Best Pavilion and Audience Awards, 8th Cairo Biennale, Cairo
 2001 – Anonymous Was A Woman Award
 2011 – John Simon Guggenheim Award in Fine Art

References

External links 
 Judith Barry collection at Museum of Modern Art (MOMA)
 The Museum You Want an interactive artwork by Judith Barry

American video artists
American women artists
1954 births
Living people
21st-century American women artists